Odadar' is a coastal village  from Porbandar, in the state of Gujarat, India. It has a population of around 4000 and is known for the many stone quarries in its vicinity. It is the original village of Odedra Mer people, and has a large temple for Gorakshanath the guru of the Odedras. Also, a temple for Shikoter Maa is to be found in this village the kuldevi for Odedras.

References

Villages in Porbandar district